Hans-Ulrich Brunner (1943–2006) was a Swiss painter.

References
This article was initially translated from the German Wikipedia.

20th-century Swiss painters
Swiss male painters
21st-century Swiss painters
21st-century Swiss male artists
1943 births
2006 deaths
20th-century Swiss male artists